The 2014–15 Los Angeles Lakers season was the franchise's 67th season, its 66th season in the National Basketball Association (NBA), and its 55th in Los Angeles. Coming off from one of the worst seasons in franchise history and missing the playoffs, the team looked to rebound. Mike D'Antoni resigned in late April following two miserable seasons, leaving the team without a head coach. In the offseason, Pau Gasol and Jodie Meeks left for Chicago and Detroit, respectively, leaving big holes to fill. After failing to land the biggest names in the offseason like Carmelo Anthony and LeBron James, the Lakers brought back numerous key role players from last season including Nick Young, Jordan Hill, and Ryan Kelly. The Lakers later acquired point guard Jeremy Lin in a trade with Houston and won the bidding rights to power forward Carlos Boozer after being amnestied by Chicago in the offseason. The Lakers also drafted Kentucky's star power forward Julius Randle and shooting guard Jordan Clarkson in the 2014 NBA Draft. The team then hired Lakers Showtime player and former Coach of the Year, Byron Scott as head coach in late July. On December 14, 2014, Kobe Bryant scored 26 points to pass Michael Jordan for third on the NBA's all-time scoring list in a 100–94 win over Minnesota.

The Lakers started the season a franchise-worst 1–9. Rookie Julius Randle was injured opening night and missed the remainder of the season. On January 28, 2015, Kobe Bryant underwent season-ending surgery for a rotator cuff tear in his right shoulder. On March 21, 2015, Steve Nash announced his retirement. The Lakers finished with a 21–61 record, placing them last in the Pacific division for the second straight season and fourteenth in the Western conference. This was the first 60 loss season in franchise history.

Key dates
 June 26: The 2014 NBA draft took place at Barclays Center in Brooklyn, New York.
 July 1: 2014 NBA free agency began.

Draft picks

Preseason
On October 23, 2014, point guard Steve Nash was ruled out for the season due to a recurring back injury.

Game log

|- style="background:#cfc;"
| 1
| October 6
| Denver
| 
| Jordan Clarkson (14)
| Jordan Hill (11)
| Jeremy Lin (10)
| Valley View Casino Center10,108
| 1–0
|- style="background:#fcc;"
| 2
| October 9
| Golden State
| 
| Carlos Boozer (16)
| Randle, Davis (7)
| Lin, Price (4)
| Staples Center13,128
| 1–1
|- style="background:#fcc;"
| 3
| October 12
| Golden State
| 
| Sacre, Ellington (12)
| Jordan Hill (7)
| Kobe Bryant (5)
| Citizens Business Bank Arena7,842
| 1–2
|- style="background:#fcc;"
| 4
| October 16
| Utah
| 
| Kobe Bryant (27)
| Jordan Hill (14)
| Kobe Bryant (4)
| Honda Center8,931
| 1–3
|- style= "background:#cfc;"
| 5
| October 19
| Utah
| 
| Kobe Bryant (26)
| Carlos Boozer (9)
| Ronnie Price (10)
| Staples Center17,733
| 2–3
|- style="background:#fcc;"
| 6
| October 21
| Phoenix
| 
| Kobe Bryant (27)
| Wesley Johnson (8)
| Ronnie Price (10)
| Honda Center8,037
| 2–4
|- style="background:#cfc;"
| 7
| October 22
| Portland
| 
| Julius Randle (17)
| Randle, Sacre (8)
| Jeremy Lin (5)
| Citizens Business Bank Arena7,174
| 3–4
|- style="background:#fcc;"
| 8
| October 24
| Sacramento
| 
| Jeremy Lin (19)
| Ed Davis (13)
| Jeremy Lin (7)
| MGM Grand Garden Arena10,890
| 3–5

Regular season
On October 28, 2014, rookie Julius Randle broke his right tibia during the Lakers' season opener against the Houston Rockets, and was expected to miss the remainder of the season. Through the season's first 10 games, the Lakers were 1–9, the worst start in the 66-year history of the franchise.

Standings

Game log

|- style="background:#fcc;"
| 1
| October 28
| Houston
| 
| Kobe Bryant (19)
| Jordan Hill (10)
| Jeremy Lin (6)
| Staples Center18,997
| 0–1
|- style="background:#fcc;"
| 2
| October 29
| @ Phoenix
| 
| Kobe Bryant (31)
| Jordan Hill (11)
| Ronnie Price (5)
| US Airways Center17,523
| 0–2
|- style="background:#fcc;"
| 3
| October 31
| L.A. Clippers
| 
| Jordan Hill (23)
| Carlos Boozer (7)
| Jeremy Lin (9)
| Staples Center18,997
| 0–3

|- style="background:#fcc;"
| 4
| November 1
| @ Golden State
| 
| Kobe Bryant (28)
| Bryant & Davis (6)
| Lin & Price (6)
| Oracle Arena19,596
| 0–4
|- style="background:#fcc;"
| 5
| November 4
| Phoenix
| 
| Kobe Bryant (39)
| Jordan Hill (15)
| Carlos Boozer (4)
| Staples Center18,997
| 0–5
|- style="background:#cfc;"
| 6
| November 9
| Charlotte
| 
| Bryant & Lin (21)
| Hill & Bryant (6)
| Ronnie Price (8)
| Staples Center18,997
| 1–5
|- style="background:#fcc;"
| 7
| November 11
| @ Memphis
| 
| Kobe Bryant (28)
| Jordan Hill (14)
| Kobe Bryant (6)
| FedEx Forum17,618
| 1–6
|- style="background:#fcc;"
| 8
| November 12
| @ New Orleans
| 
| Kobe Bryant (33)
| Ed Davis (11)
| Kobe Bryant (5)
| Smoothie King Center17,359
| 1–7
|- style="background:#fcc;"
| 9
| November 14
| San Antonio
| 
| Carlos Boozer (19)
| Jordan Hill (11)
| Kobe Bryant (6)
| Staples Center18,997
| 1–8
|- style="background:#fcc;"
| 10
| November 16
| Golden State
| 
| Kobe Bryant (44)
| Jordan Hill (11)
| Ronnie Price (5)
| Staples Center18,997
| 1–9
|- style="background:#cfc;"
| 11
| November 18
| @ Atlanta
| 
| Kobe Bryant (28)
| Hill & Boozer (10)
| Jeremy Lin (10)
| Philips Arena17,848
| 2–9
|- style="background:#cfc;"
| 12
| November 19
| @ Houston
| 
| Kobe Bryant (29)
| Carlos Boozer (13)
| Kobe Bryant (7)
| Toyota Center18,245
| 3–9
|- style="background:#fcc;"
| 13
| November 21
| @ Dallas
| 
| Jeremy Lin (18)
| Jordan Hill (10)
| Kobe Bryant (7)
| American Airlines Center20,353
| 3–10
|- style="background:#fcc;"
| 14
| November 23
| Denver
| 
| Kobe Bryant (27)
| Jordan Hill (14)
| Jeremy Lin (5)
| Staples Center18,997
| 3–11
|- style="background:#fcc;"
| 15
| November 26
| Memphis
| 
| Kobe Bryant (22)
| Ed Davis (8)
| Lin & Price (5)
| Staples Center18,997
| 3–12
|- style="background:#fcc;"
| 16
| November 28
| Minnesota
| 
| Kobe Bryant (26)
| Ed Davis (10)
| Jeremy Lin (11)
| Staples Center18,997
| 3–13
|- style="background:#cfc;"
| 17
| November 30
| Toronto
| 
| Kobe Bryant (31)
| Jordan Hill (12)
| Kobe Bryant (12)
| Staples Center18,997
| 4–13

|- style="background:#cfc;"
| 18
| December 2
| @ Detroit
| 
| Jordan Hill (22)
| Jordan Hill (13)
| Kobe Bryant (13)
| The Palace of Auburn Hills14,083
| 5–13
|- style="background:#fcc;"
| 19
| December 3
| @ Washington
| 
| Kobe Bryant (29)
| Davis & Boozer (8)
| Jeremy Lin (5)
| Verizon Center18,490
| 5–14
|- style="background:#fcc;"
| 20
| December 5
| @ Boston
| 
| Kobe Bryant (22)
| Ed Davis (9)
| Bryant, Price & Ellington (3)
| TD Garden18,624
| 5–15
|- style="background:#fcc;"
| 21
| December 7
| New Orleans
| 
| Kobe Bryant (14)
| Davis & Hill (7)
| Lin & Bryant (4)
| Staples Center18,997
| 5–16
|- style="background:#cfc;"
| 22
| December 9
| Sacramento
| 
| Kobe Bryant (32)
| Carlos Boozer (9)
| Bryant & Price (6)
| Staples Center18,267
| 6–16
|- style="background:#cfc;"
| 23
| December 12
| @ San Antonio
| 
| Nick Young (29)
| Carlos Boozer (13)
| Kobe Bryant (9)
| AT&T Center18,581
| 7–16
|- style="background:#cfc;"
| 24
| December 14
| @ Minnesota
| 
| Kobe Bryant (26)
| Carlos Boozer (13)
| Johnson & Lin (6)
| Target Center15,008
| 8–16
|- style="background:#fcc;"
| 25
| December 15
| @ Indiana
| 
| Kobe Bryant (21)
| Carlos Boozer (10)
| Kobe Bryant (3)
| Bankers Life Fieldhouse15,261
| 8–17
|- style="background:#fcc;"
| 26
| December 19
| Oklahoma City
| 
| Ed Davis (18)
| Ed Davis (9)
| Kobe Bryant (8)
| Staples Center18,997
| 8–18
|- style="background:#fcc;"
| 27
| December 21
| @ Sacramento
| 
| Nick Young (26)
| Jordan Hill (9)
| Jeremy Lin (5)
| Sleep Train Arena17,317
| 8–19
|- style="background:#cfc;"
| 28
| December 23
| Golden State
| 
| Carlos Boozer (18)
| Carlos Boozer (9)
| Ronnie Price (8)
| Staples Center18,997
| 9–19
|- style="background:#fcc"
| 29
| December 25
| @ Chicago
| 
| Wesley Johnson (18)
| Ed Davis (14)
| Ronnie Price (8)
| United Center22,865
| 9–20
|- style="background:#fcc;"
| 30
| December 26
| @ Dallas
| 
| Carlos Boozer (18)
| Ed Davis (11)
| Jeremy Lin (7)
| American Airlines Center20,424
| 9–21
|- style="background:#fcc;"
| 31
| December 28
| Phoenix
| 
| Nick Young (21)
| Bryant & Davis (9)
| Kobe Bryant (7)
| Staples Center18,997
| 9–22
|- style="background:#cfc;"
| 32
| December 30
| @ Denver
| 
| Kobe Bryant (23)
| Kobe Bryant (11)
| Kobe Bryant (11)
| Pepsi Center17,248
| 10–22

|- style="background:#fcc;"
| 33
| January 2
| Memphis
| 
| Lin & Davis (20)
| Kobe Bryant (9)
| Kobe Bryant (8)
| Staples Center18,997
| 10–23
|- style="background:#cfc;"
| 34
| January 4
| Indiana
| 
| Nick Young (22)
| Bryant & Davis (6)
| Kobe Bryant (6)
| Staples Center18,997
| 11–23
|- style="background:#fcc;"
| 35
| January 5
| @ Portland
| 
| Jordan Hill (23)
| Jordan Hill (11)
| Ronnie Price (8)
| Rose Garden19,827
| 11–24
|- style="background:#fcc;"
| 36
| January 7
| @ LA Clippers
| 
| Jordan Clarkson (14)
| Kobe Bryant (8)
| Kobe Bryant (7)
| Staples Center19,487
| 11–25
|- style="background:#cfc;"
| 37
| January 9
| Orlando
| 
| Jeremy Lin (18)
| Carlos Boozer (14)
| Jeremy Lin (6)
| Staples Center18,997
| 12–25
|- style="background:#fcc;"
| 38
| January 11
| Portland
| 
| Wesley Johnson (17)
| Carlos Boozer (9)
| Ronnie Price (12)
| Staples Center18,997
| 12–26
|- style="background:#fcc;"
| 39
| January 13
| Miami
| 
| Bryant, Hill & Davis (12)
| Tarik Black (9)
| Kobe Bryant (7)
| Staples Center18,997
| 12–27
|- style="background:#fcc;"
| 40
| January 15
| Cleveland
| 
| Jordan Hill (20)
| Bryant & Hill (6)
| Kobe Bryant (17)
| Staples Center18,997
| 12–28
|- style="background:#fcc;"
| 41
| January 16
| @ Utah
| 
| Nick Young (23)
| Jordan Hill (11)
| Jeremy Lin (3)
| EnergySolutions Arena19,911
| 12–29
|- style="background:#fcc;"
| 42
| January 19
| @ Phoenix
| 
| Nick Young (24)
| Ed Davis (11)
| Jeremy Lin (10)
| US Airways Center17,435
| 12–30
|- style="background:#fcc;"
| 43
| January 21
| @ New Orleans
| 
| Jordan Hill (15)
| Jordan Hill (13)
| Wesley Johnson (4)
| Smoothie King Center16,268
| 12–31
|- style="background:#fcc;"
| 44
| January 23
| @ San Antonio
| 
| Nick Young (17)
| Sacre & Boozer (7)
| Ronnie Price (6)
| AT&T Center18,581
| 12–32
|- style="background:#fcc;"
| 45
| January 25
| Houston
| 
| Carlos Boozer (18)
| Ed Davis (13)
| Jeremy Lin (6)
| Staples Center18,997
| 12–33
|- style="background:#fcc;"
| 46
| January 27
| Washington
| 
| Wayne Ellington (28)
| Jordan Hill (11)
| Jeremy Lin (8)
| Staples Center18,997
| 12–34
|- style="background:#cfc;"
| 47
| January 29
| Chicago
| 
| Jordan Hill (26)
| Jordan Hill (12)
| Jeremy Lin (5)
| Staples Center18,997
| 13–34

|- style="background:#fcc;"
| 48
| February 1
| @ New York
| 
| Boozer & Clarkson (19)
| Carlos Boozer (10)
| Jeremy Lin (7)
| Madison Square Garden19,812
| 13–35
|- style="background:#fcc;"
| 49
| February 4
| @ Milwaukee
| 
| Carlos Boozer (28)
| Ed Davis (20)
| Jeremy Lin (6)
| BMO Harris Bradley Center19,812
| 13–36
|- style="background:#fcc;"
| 50
| February 6
| @ Orlando
| 
| Ryan Kelly (20)
| Wesley Johnson (9)
| Jordan Clarkson (6)
| Amway Center16,206
| 13–37
|- style="background:#fcc;"
| 51
| February 8
| @ Cleveland
| 
| Jordan Clarkson (20)
| Ed Davis (9)
| Jordan Clarkson (4)
| Quicken Loans Arena20,562
| 13–38
|- style="background:#fcc;"
| 52
| February 10
| Denver
| 
| Carlos Boozer (21)
| Carlos Boozer (10)
| Jordan Clarkson (7)
| Staples Center18,466
| 13–39
|- style="background:#fcc;"
| 53
| February 11
| @ Portland
| 
| Jordan Clarkson (17)
| Ed Davis (9)
| Jordan Clarkson (4)
| Rose Garden19,585
| 13–40
|- align="center"
|colspan="9" bgcolor="#bbcaff"|All-Star Break
|- style="background:#fcc;"
| 54
| February 20
| Brooklyn
| 
| Jeremy Lin (18)
| Ed Davis (14)
| Ronnie Price (8)
| Staples Center19,585
| 13–41
|- style="background:#cfc;"
| 55
| February 22
| Boston
| 
| Jeremy Lin (25)
| Carlos Boozer (8)
| Jeremy Lin (6)
| Staples Center18,997
| 14–41
|- style="background:#cfc;"
| 56
| February 25
| @ Utah
| 
| Jordan Clarkson (22)
| Wayne Ellington (10)
| Clarkson & Lin & Davis (3)
| EnergySolutions Arena19,911
| 15–41
|- style="background:#cfc;"
| 57
| February 27
| Milwaukee
| 
| Jordan Clarkson (16)
| Ed Davis (9)
| Jeremy Lin (6)
| Staples Center18,997
| 16–41

|- style="background:#fcc;"
| 58
| March 1
| Oklahoma City
| 
| Jeremy Lin (20)
| Jordan Hill (12)
| Jeremy Lin (8)
| Staples Center18,997
| 16–42
|- style="background:#fcc;"
| 59
| March 3
| @ Charlotte
| 
| Jeremy Lin (23)
| Carlos Boozer (11)
| Jeremy Lin (8)
| Time Warner Cable Arena18,997
| 16–43
|- style="background:#fcc;"
| 60
| March 4
| @ Miami
| 
| Ellington & Davis (14)
| Ed Davis (12)
| Jeremy Lin (9)
| American Airlines Arena19,600
| 16–44
|- style="background:#fcc;"
| 61
| March 6
| @ Memphis
| 
| Jordan Clarkson (25)
| Carlos Boozer (9)
| Jordan Clarkson (6)
| FedEx Forum19,600
| 16–45
|- style="background:#fcc;"
| 62
| March 8
| Dallas
| 
| Carlos Boozer (17)
| Boozer & Davis (8)
| Lin & Clarkson (5)
| Staples Center18,997
| 16–46
|- style="background:#cfc;"
| 63
| March 10
| Detroit
| 
| Jordan Hill (26)
| Carlos Boozer (16)
| Jordan Clarkson (8)
| Staples Center17,771
| 17–46
|- style="background:#fcc;"
| 64
| March 12
| New York
| 
| Jordan Hill (19)
| Tarik Black (11)
| Jeremy Lin (7)
| Staples Center18,997
| 17–47
|- style="background:#fcc;"
| 65
| March 15
| Atlanta
| 
| Boozer & Kelly (13)
| Ed Davis (13)
| Jordan Clarkson (6)
| Staples Center17,422
| 17–48
|- style="background:#fcc;"
| 66
| March 16
| @ Golden State
| 
| Clarkson & Ellington (17)
| Jordan Hill (12)
| Jordan Hill (5)
| Oracle Arena19,596
| 17–49
|- style="background:#fcc;"
| 67
| March 19
| Utah
| 
| Tarik Black (13)
| Black & Hill (10)
| Jordan Clarkson (6)
| Staples Center17,407
| 17–50
|- style="background:#cfc;"
| 68
| March 22
| Philadelphia
| 
| Jeremy Lin (29)
| Ed Davis (11)
| Jeremy Lin (5)
| Staples Center17,891
| 18–50
|- style="background:#fcc;"
| 69
| March 24
| @ Oklahoma City
| 
| Jordan Clarkson (30)
| Tarik Black (6)
| Lin & Clarkson (7)
| Chesapeake Energy Arena18,203
| 18–51
|- style="background:#cfc;"
| 70
| March 25
| @ Minnesota
| 
| Jordan Clarkson (20)
| Ed Davis (9)
| Lin & Clarkson (5)
| Target Center13,438
| 19–51
|- style="background:#fcc;"
| 71
| March 27
| @ Toronto
| 
| Jeremy Lin (18)
| Tarik Black (10)
| Jeremy Lin (5)
| Air Canada Centre19,800
| 19–52
|- style="background:#fcc;"
| 72
| March  29
| @ Brooklyn
| 
| Jordan Hill (22)
| Jordan Hill (16)
| Jordan Clarkson (7)
| Barclays Center17,732
| 19–53
|- style="background:#cfc;"
| 73
| March 30
| @ Philadelphia
| 
| Jordan Clarkson (26)
| Wesley Johnson (11)
| Jordan Clarkson (11)
| Wells Fargo Center13,501
| 20–53

|- style="background:#fcc;"
| 74
| April 1
| New Orleans
| 
| Jordan Clarkson (18)
| Wesley Johnson (8)
| Jordan Clarkson (10)
| Staples Center17,165
| 20–54
|- style="background:#fcc;"
| 75
| April 3
| Portland
| 
| Jordan Clarkson (27)
| Wesley Johnson (15)
| Jordan Clarkson (5)
| Staples Center18,997
| 20–55
|- style="background:#fcc;"
| 76
| April 5
| LA Clippers
| 
| Wesley Johnson (16)
| Tarik Black (9)
| Ryan Kelly (7)
| Staples Center18,997
| 20–56
|- style="background:#fcc;"
| 77
| April 7
| @ LA Clippers
| 
| Jordan Clarkson (20)
| Ed Davis (11)
| Jordan Clarkson (6)
| Staples Center19,438
| 20–57
|- style="background:#fcc;"
| 78
| April 8
| @ Denver
| 
| Jordan Clarkson (21)
| Ed Davis (12)
| Jordan Clarkson (9)
| Pepsi Center13,338
| 20–58
|- style="background:#cfc;"
| 79
| April 10
| Minnesota
| 
| Ryan Kelly (21)
| Tarik Black (10)
| Jordan Clarkson (9)
| Staples Center17,880
| 21–58
|- style="background:#fcc;"
| 80
| April 12
| Dallas
| 
| Jordan Clarkson (26)
| Tarik Black (19)
| Clarkson & Kelly (6)
| Staples Center18,071
| 21–59
|- style="background:#fcc;"
| 81
| April 13
| @ Sacramento
| 
| Jordan Clarkson (23)
| Ed Davis (14)
| Jabari Brown (7)
| Sleep Train Arena17,317
| 21–60
|- style="background:#fcc;"
| 82
| April 15
| Sacramento
| 
| Jabari Brown (32)
| Ed Davis (12)
| Vander Blue (8)
| Staples Center18,997
| 21–61

Player statistics

Summer League

|-
|}

Preseason

|-
|}

Regular season

|
| 59 || 38 || 25 || .448 || .314 || .829 || 3.2 || 3.5 || 0.9 || 0.2 || 14.5
|-
|
| 35 || 35 || 34.5 || .373 || .293 || .813 || 5.7 || 5.6 || 1.3 || 0.2 || 22.3
|-
|
| 76 || 59 || 29.5 || .414 || .351 || .804 || 4.2 || 1.6 || 0.8 || 0.6 || 9.9
|-
|
| 52 || 34 || 23.7 || .337 || .336 || .832 || 2.8 || 1.8 || 0.6 || 0.5 || 6.4
|-
|
| 70 || 57 || 26.8 || .459 || .273 || .738 || 7.9 || 1.5 || 0.5 || 0.7 || 12
|-
|
| 74 || 30 || 25.8 || .424 || .369 || .795 || 2.6 || 4.6 || 1.1 || 0.4 || 11.2
|-
|
| 42 || 0 || 23.8 || .366 || .369 || .892 || 2.3 || 1 || 0.5 || 0.3 || 13.4
|-
|
| 71 || 26 || 23.8 || .499 || .000 || .627 || 6.8 || 1.3 || 0.6 || 0.2 || 11.8
|-
|
| 65 || 36 || 25.8 || .412 || .370 || .813 || 3.2 || 1.6 || 0.5 || 0 || 10
|-
|
| 19 || 5 || 29.9 || .412 || .371 || .753 || 1.9 || 2.1 || 0.6 || 0.1 || 11.9
|-
|
| 43 || 20 || 22.8 || .345 || .284 || .800 || 1.6 || 3.8 || 1.6 || 0.1 || 5.1
|-
|
| 79 || 24 || 23.3 || .601 || .000 || .487 || 7,6 || 1.2 || 0.6 || 1.2 || 8.3
|-
|
| 67 || 18 || 16.9 || .412 || .000 || .671 || 3.5 || 0.8 || 0.4 || 0.6 || 4.6
|-
|
| 63 || 39 || 19 || .575 || .000 || .551 || 5.8 || 0.7 || 0.3 || 0.4 || 6
|-
|
| 9 || 0 || 9.6 || .231 || .000 || .583 || 0.4 || 0.3 || 0.3 || 0 || 2.2
|-
|}

Injuries

Roster

Transactions

Trades

Free agents

Re-signed
Nick Young

Jordan Hill

Xavier Henry

Wesley Johnson

Ryan Kelly

Additions

Subtractions

Awards

References

External links

 2014–15 Los Angeles Lakers preseason at ESPN
 2014–15 Los Angeles Lakers regular season at ESPN

 

Los Angeles Lakers seasons
Los Angeles Lakers
Los Angle
Los Angle